Kastanozem (also known as "chestnut soil") is one of the 32 Reference Soil Groups of the World Reference Base for Soil Resources (WRB). These soils are brighter than Chernozems, and are related to the Mollisols in the USDA soil taxonomy.  They are rich in humus, and originally covered with early maturing native grasslands vegetation, which produces a characteristic brown surface layer in the first meter in depth. They have a relative high level of available calcium ions bound to soil particles and can have a petrocalcic horizon between 25 and 100 cm thick.

Kastanozems are found in relatively dry zones with 200 to 450 mm of rainfall a year.

The name is derived from the Russian term 'каштановые почвы', where 'каштановые' is a shade of brown derived from the word "каштан" (kashtan), "chestnut" and refers to the color of its husk.

References 
 IUSS Working Group WRB: World Reference Base for Soil Resources, fourth edition. International Union of Soil Sciences, Vienna 2022. .
Encyclopædia Britannica, 2012. Kastanozems.

Further reading
 W. Zech, P. Schad, G. Hintermaier-Erhard: Soils of the World. Springer, Berlin 2022, Chapter 5.3.3.

External links 
 profile photos (with classification) WRB homepage
 profile photos (with classification) IUSS World of Soils

Types of soil